Darling Caroline (French: Caroline chérie) is a 1968 historical drama film directed by Denys de La Patellière and starring France Anglade, Vittorio De Sica and Bernard Blier. Made as a co-production between France, Italy and West Germany, it was based on the novel of the same title by Jacques Laurent which had previously been adapted into a film in 1951.

It was shot at the Epinay Studios near Paris. The film's sets were by the art director Jean André. The costumes were designed by Jacques Fonteray. It was shot in widescreen and Eastmancolor.

Cast
 France Anglade as Caroline de Bièvre - une jolie aristocrate aux nombreuses aventures
 Vittorio De Sica as Le comte de Bièvre - le père de Caroline
 Bernard Blier as Georges Berthier
 Karin Dor as Isabelle de Loigny
 François Guérin as Gaston de Salanches
 Charles Aznavour as Jules, le Postillon
 Giorgio Albertazzi as Albencet, le géologiste
 Françoise Christophe as Madame Chabanne
 Gert Fröbe as Le docteur Belhomme 
 Jean-Claude Brialy as Le comte de Boimussy
 François Chaumette as Van Kript I
 Valeria Ciangottini as Marie-Anne
 Jean-Pierre Darras as Van Kript II
 Roger Dumas as Clément, l'ancien jardinier du comte
 Isa Miranda as La duchesse de Bussez
 Jacques Monod as De Carilly, le docteur
 Sady Rebbot as L'homme enfermé avec Caroline
 Pierre Vernier as Bonaparte
 Béatrice Altariba as Une aristocrate chez Belhomme
 Henri Virlojeux as Le docteur Guillotin

References

Bibliography 
 Orio Caldiron & Matilde Hochkofler. Isa Miranda. Gremese Editore.

External links 
 

1968 films
West German films
French historical drama films
German historical drama films
Italian historical drama films
1960s historical drama films
1960s French-language films
Films directed by Denys de La Patellière
Constantin Film films
Films based on French novels
Films shot at Epinay Studios
Remakes of French films
Italian remakes of French films
French Revolution films
Films based on works by Jacques Laurent
1960s French films
1960s Italian films
1960s German films